The 1931 Baylor Bears football team represented Baylor University in the Southwest Conference (SWC) during the 1931 college football season. In their sixth season under head coach Morley Jennings, the Bears compiled a 3–6 record (1–5 against conference opponents), finished in sixth place in the conference, and were outscored by opponents by a combined total of 134 to 100. They played their home games at Carroll Field in Waco, Texas. Maurice S. Pierce was the team captain.

Schedule

References

Baylor
Baylor Bears football seasons
Baylor Bears football